Westin is a Swedish surname.

Geographical distribution
As of 2014, 53.2% of all known bearers of the surname Westin were residents of Sweden (frequency 1:2,799), 21.8% of the United States (1:250,869), 14.5% of Brazil (1:212,370), 2.1% of Norway (1:36,214), 1.9% of Canada (1:294,384), 1.6% of Australia (1:218,109) and 1.0% of Finland (1:80,835).

In Sweden, the frequency of the surname was higher than national average (1:2,799) in the following counties:
 1. Västernorrland County (1:413)
 2. Gävleborg County (1:1,334)
 3. Västerbotten County (1:1,811)
 4. Uppsala County (1:1,851)
 5. Stockholm County (1:2,029)
 6. Jämtland County (1:2,103)

People
 David Westin (born 1952), American television news anchor and former president of ABC News
 Jens Westin (born 1989), Swedish ice hockey player
 John Westin (born 1992), Swedish ice hockey player, brother of Jens
 Leslie L. Westin (1917-1985), American educator and politician
 Sherrie Rollins Westin, American nonprofit leader and government official and wife of David
 Lars Westin, Swedish Jazz journalist and radio personality

References

Swedish-language surnames